The Washington Research Library Consortium (WRLC) was established as a non-profit corporation in 1987 to support and enhance the library and information services of universities in the Washington, DC metropolitan area. It aims to do this through expanding coordination between different research libraries in the area. Major services they provide include operation of a shared online catalog, hosting an annual meeting for people involved in DC-Area research libraries, and providing environmentally controlled additional storage space for books and other media. The executive director as of 2021 was Mark Jacobs.

Member universities

External links
WRLC website

Library consortia in Washington, D.C.
Library consortia in Maryland